Firmin Van Kerrebroeck (14 December 1922 – 17 August 2011) was a Belgian cyclo-cross cyclist. Professional from 1947 to 1966, he won the Belgian National Cyclo-cross Championships six times and a silver medal at the 1957 UCI Cyclo-cross World Championships, winning a total of 44 cyclo-crosses during his career. During the summer, he also occasionally competed in road races. He then coached the Belgian national team for sixteen years and won twenty world championship titles with his riders, notably Eric and Roger De Vlaeminck and Roland Liboton.

References

External links

1922 births
2011 deaths
Belgian male cyclists
Cyclo-cross cyclists
Belgian cyclo-cross champions
Sportspeople from Ghent
Cyclists from East Flanders